Tifcha (also spelled Tifkha, Tipcha and other variant English spellings) is a cantillation mark commonly found in the Torah, Haftarah, and other books that are chanted. In Sephardic and Oriental traditions, it is called Tarcha, meaning "dragging" or "effort".

The Tifcha is found in both the Etnachta group as the second member of that group, and in the Sof passuk group, though the melody varies slightly in each. While it is a weak sound, it is considered to be stronger than a Tevir

The Hebrew word טִפְחָ֖א translates into English as diagonal. It is related to the word tefach (טפח, measurement of the palm). The tifcha does not have a separating value of its own, as it is in the middle of a set of words.

Tifcha occurs in the Torah 11,285 times, more than any other trope sound. Tifcha is the only trope sound to appear more than 10,000 times in the Torah.

The first word of the Torah בראשית (Bereshit) is on a Tifcha.

Total occurrences

Melodies
Melodies for tifcha, as for all other cantillation marks, is different in different traditions. The diagrams below show the Polish-Lithuanian tradition.

In Ethnachta group

In Sof Passuk group

Occurrence rules
In the Etnachta group, the tifcha will always occur, regardless of whether or not there is a Mercha. Before a Sof Passuk, the Tifcha can only occur in conjunction with a Mercha.

References

Cantillation marks